Montreuil-Bellay is a commune in the Maine-et-Loire department in western France.

It is located approximately 15 km to the south of Saumur, and is famous for the Château de Montreuil-Bellay, which is situated in the town.

Montreuil-Bellay is on the Thouet, and was the head of navigation until navigation ceased at the beginning of the 20th century. The navigation works were undertaken in the 15th century by the lords of Montreuil-Bellay, who in turn were granted letters patent by King Charles VII allowing them to raise a tax on wine that would pass through their land. Montreuil-Bellay station has rail connections to Tours, Saumur, Bressuire and La Roche-sur-Yon.

See also
Communes of the Maine-et-Loire department

References

Montreuilbellay
Anjou